Anil Biswas (2 March 1944 – 26 March 2006) often referred to as Keru was an Indian communist politician. He was the secretary of the West Bengal State Committee of Communist Party of India (Marxist) and member of the party's politburo beginning in 1998 until his death in 2006.

Early life 
Biswas born in a peasant family of Darermath village near Karimpur, Nadia district. While in high school he was attracted to the Left movement in the area. in 1961 he joined the Krishnagar Government College and came under the influence of Marxist leaders like Harinarayan Adhikari and Dinesh Mazumdar and also became an active member of the Students' Federation of India. He was a student leader in College elections. After taking an Honours degree in political science, he shifted to Kolkata to pursue his academic career.

Politics 
He became the full-fledged party member of the CPI(M) in 1965. In the same year he was arrested under the Defence of India Rules 1962 and was imprisoned for 11 months. From jail custody he completed the master's degree in political science. In 1969 he became a whole-timer of the party and joined Ganashakti as a reporter. Biswas' close association with Ganashakti continued until 1998 and it was during his editorship the newspaper reached the height of circulation. Anil Biswas became member of the Central Committee of the party in the year of 1985. In 1998 he took charge of the General secretary of the State committee and also became a member of the Polit Bureau. He was mentored by Pramod Dasgupta.

He was the editor of Marxbadi Path (The Road of the Marxist), the theoretical quarterly in West Bengal.

He was known to be a deft strategist and the brain behind the party's important decisions in West Bengal politics. In one of his genius decisions, he influenced the party to name Buddhadeb Bhattacharjee as Chief Minister of West Bengal replacing Jyoti Basu before the 2000 West Bengal Legislative Assembly Elections. This was a strategically shrewd decision because people of West Bengal were frustrated by the same Chief Minister for more than 20 years. It got the Left front a huge victory in spite of strong opposition from Mamata Banerjee's TMC. Because of Anil Biswas' organized election tactics as the State General Secretary in the 2006 West Bengal Assembly Election, the opposition reduced to significantly small number of seats. He used to manage the media and the ground-workers so well that he knew the pulse of the general public in and out. It is largely believed that the demise of Anil Biswas and other important ground-leaders such as Subhas Chakraborty paved the way for the opposition to come into power replacing the Left Front.

Death 
He died on 26 March 2006 after being hospitalised by a brain haemorrhage on 18 March. His body was donated to NRS Medical College and Hospital according to his last wishes. He is survived by his wife Gita and daughter Ajanta.

References

Sources
 Obituary on sify.com
 "Anil Biswas dead" - The Hindu article dated 26 March 2006
 "CPI(M) leader Anil Biswas dead" - Hindustan Times article dated 26 March 2006

Communist Party of India (Marxist) politicians from West Bengal
1944 births
2006 deaths
People from Nadia district
Krishnagar Government College alumni
West Bengal politicians
Journalists from West Bengal
20th-century Bengalis
Bengali Hindus
Indian newspaper editors
20th-century Indian journalists
Indian political journalists
Indian Marxist journalists